Cipriano Barace (1641–1702) was a Spanish Jesuit, missionary, and martyr.

1641 births
1702 deaths
17th-century Spanish Jesuits
Catholic martyrs
Spanish Roman Catholic missionaries